Immaculata High School was a private, Roman Catholic high school in Leavenworth, Kansas, United States.  It was located in the Roman Catholic Archdiocese of Kansas City in Kansas.

History
Immaculata High School officially closed its doors on June 2, 2017, due to continuing enrollment problems and rising tuition costs.

Extracurricular Activities
The Raiders competed in the Northeast Kansas League and were classified as a 1A school, the smallest classification in Kansas according to the Kansas State High School Activities Association.

Athletics
Immaculata High School was a member of the Kansas State High School Activities Association and participated in the Northeast Kansas League.
Below, are sports that were offered at the school.

Boys' Athletic Teams
 Baseball
 Basketball
 Football
 Soccer
 Tennis
 Wrestling

Girls' Athletic Teams
 Basketball
 Cheerleading
 Pom Squad
 Softball
 Tennis
 Volleyball

Co-ed Athletic Teams
 Golf
 Powerlifting
 Track & Field

Clubs & Organizations
Immaculata High School offered a variety of clubs/organizations for the students. A list of clubs that were offered, are listed below:

 Art Club
 Band
 Choir
 IMAC Singers
 International Club
 National Honor Society
 Scholar's Bowl
 Spanish Honor Society
 Student Council
 Student Who Cares

Notable alumni
 Johnny Hetki, former MLB player (Cincinnati Reds, St. Louis Browns, Pittsburgh Pirates)

References

External links
 School Website
 Leavenworth Regional Catholic School System

Roman Catholic Archdiocese of Kansas City in Kansas
Catholic secondary schools in Kansas
Schools in Leavenworth County, Kansas
Educational institutions established in 1912
1912 establishments in Kansas
Buildings and structures in Leavenworth, Kansas